This is a list of historical figures who have been characters in ballets.

List of historical figures

A
Hans Christian Andersen, Danish author
 Lera Auerbach: The Little Mermaid (as the Poet)
Anna Anderson, impostor of Grand Duchess Anastasia Nikolaevna of Russia
 Ballet to music by Bohuslav Martinů, Pyotr Ilyich Tchaikovsky: Anastasia
Andrew II of Hungary, King of Hungary 
 Alexander Glazunov: Raymonda

B
Bahram V, King of Persia
 Gara Garayev: Seven Beauties
Giovanni Boldini, Italian genre and portrait painter
 Lorenzo Ferrero:  Franca Florio, regina di Palermo
William H. Bonney (Billy the Kid), frontier outlaw in the American Old West
 Aaron Copland: Billy the Kid 
Lizzie Borden, American woman who was acquitted for murder
 Morton Gould: Fall River Legend

C
Marie Anne de Cupis de Camargo, French/Belgian dancer
 Ludwig Minkus: Camargo
Caravaggio, Italian Baroque painter 
 Ballet to music by Bruno Moretti based on Claudio Monteverdi: Caravaggio
Caroline Matilda of Great Britain, Queen of Denmark and Norway, the wife of Christian VII of Denmark
 Peter Maxwell Davies: Caroline Mathilde
Fanny Cerrito, Italian ballet dancer and choreographer
 Ballet to music by John Field: Pas des Déesses 
Cleopatra, last ruler of Ptolemaic Egypt
 Anton Arensky et al.: Cleopatra
Marcus Licinius Crassus, Roman general and politician  
 Aram Khachaturian: Spartacus
Cyrano de Bergerac, French dramatist 
 Marius Constant: Cyrano de Bergerac

D
Hugh Despenser the Younger, royal chamberlain and a favourite of Edward II of England
 John McCabe: Edward II
Sergei Diaghilev, Russian art critic, ballet impresario, and founder of the Ballets Russes
 Ballet to music by Chopin, Schumann, Rimsky-Korsakow and Shostakovich: Nijinsky
 Ballet to a collage of existing music arranged by Bob Zimmerman: Nijinsky – Dancer, Clown, God
Charles Didelot, French dancer and choreographer
 Ballet to music by William Boyce, arranged by Constant Lambert: The Prospect Before Us
Isadora Duncan, American dancer
 Richard Rodney Bennett: Isadora

E
Edward II of England, King of England
 John McCabe: Edward II
Edward III of England, King of England
 John McCabe: Edward II
Caroline Alice Elgar, English author
 Ballet to music by Edward Elgar: Enigma Variations
Edward Elgar, English composer
 Ballet to music by Edward Elgar: Enigma Variations
Empress Elisabeth of Austria, Empress consort of Austria
 Ballet to music by Franz Liszt: Mayerling
Elizabeth I of England, Queen of England and Ireland
 Ballet to music by Anton Webern: Episodes

F
Franca Florio, Italian noblewoman, socialite and a prominent protagonist of the Belle Époque
 Lorenzo Ferrero:  Franca Florio, regina di Palermo
Ignazio Florio Jr., Italian entrepreneur
 Lorenzo Ferrero:  Franca Florio, regina di Palermo
Saint Francis of Assisi, founder of the Franciscans
 Paul Hindemith: Nobilissima Visione
Franz Joseph I of Austria, Emperor of Austria and King of Hungary
 Ballet to music by Franz Liszt: Mayerling

G
Piers Gaveston, 1st Earl of Cornwall, English nobleman
 John McCabe: Edward II
Archduchess Gisela of Austria, second daughter of Emperor Franz Joseph I of Austria
 Ballet to music by Franz Liszt: Mayerling
Lucile Grahn, Danish ballerina
 Ballet to music by John Field: Pas des Déesses   
Alfred Grünfeld, court pianist of Emperor Franz Joseph I of Austria
 Ballet to music by Franz Liszt: Mayerling

H
James Hepburn, 4th Earl of Bothwell, Lord High Admiral of Scotland and 3rd husband of Mary, Queen of Scotland
 Ballet to music by Anton Webern: Episodes
Herodias, a princess of the Herodian Dynasty
 Paul Hindemith: Hérodiade
E. T. A. Hoffmann, German Romantic author
 Ballet to music by Jacques Offenbach: Tales of Hoffmann

I
Isabella of France, Queen of England as the wife of Edward II
 John McCabe: Edward II 
Ivan the Terrible, Tsar of Russia
 Ballet to music by Sergei Prokofiev: Ivan the Terrible

J
August Jaeger, Anglo-German music publisher
 Ballet to music by Edward Elgar: Enigma Variations
Jiang Qing, Chinese figure, 4th wife of Mao Zedong
 John Adams: The Chairman Dances (as Chiang Ch'ing)

K
Frida Kahlo, Mexican painter
 Peter Salem: Broken Wings
Mathilde Kschessinska, Russian prima ballerina
 Ballet to music by Pyotr Ilyich Tchaikovsky and Bohuslav Martinů: Anastasia
Andrey Kurbsky, Russian figure, political opponent of Ivan the Terrible
 Ballet to music by Sergei Prokofiev: Ivan the Terrible

L
Countess Marie Larisch von Moennich, niece of Empress Elisabeth of Austria
 Ballet to music by Franz Liszt: Mayerling
Louis XVI of France, King of France
 Boris Asafyev: Flames of Paris
Princess Louise of Belgium, wife of Prince Philipp of Saxe-Coburg and Gotha
 Ballet to music by Franz Liszt: Mayerling

M
La Malinche, Aztec mistress of Hernán Cortés
 Norman Lloyd: La Malinche
Mao Zedong, Chinese leader
 John Adams: The Chairman Dances
Marie Antoinette, Queen of France and Navarre
 Boris Asafyev: Flames of Paris
Archduchess Marie Valerie of Austria, third daughter of Emperor Franz Joseph I of Austria
 Ballet to music by Franz Liszt: Mayerling
Mary, Queen of Scots, Queen of Scotland
 Ballet to music by Anton Webern: Episodes
Léonide Massine, Russian ballet dancer and choreographer
 Ballet to music by Chopin, Schumann, Rimsky-Korsakow and Shostakovich: Nijinsky
George "Bay" Middleton, English horseman
 Ballet to music by Franz Liszt: Mayerling
Roger Mortimer, 1st Earl of March, English nobleman
 John McCabe: Edward II

N
Vaslav Nijinsky, Russian ballet dancer and choreographer
 Ballet to music by Pierre Henry and Pyotr Ilyich Tchaikovsky: Nijinsky, clown de Dieu
 Ballet to music by Johann Sebastian Bach: Vaslav
 Ballet to music by Chopin, Schumann, Rimsky-Korsakow and Shostakovich: Nijinsky
 Ballet to a collage of existing music arranged by Bob Zimmerman: Nijinsky – Dancer, Clown, God
Jean-Georges Noverre, French dancer and ballet master
 Ballet to music by William Boyce, arranged by Constant Lambert: The Prospect Before Us

O

P
Niccolò Paganini, Italian violinist, violist, guitarist, and composer
 Ballet to music by Sergei Rachmaninoff: Paganini
Denis Papin, French physicist, mathematician and inventor
 Romualdo Marenco: Excelsior 
Philippa of Hainault, Queen of England as the wife of King Edward III
 John McCabe: Edward II 
Prince Philipp of Saxe-Coburg and Gotha, Prince of Saxe-Coburg and Gotha
 Ballet to music by Franz Liszt: Mayerling

Q

R
Jacques Renaudin (Valentin le désossé), French can-can dancer
 Ballet to music by Emmanuel Chabrier: Bar aux Folies-Bergère 
Arthur Rimbaud, French poet
 Ballet to music by Benjamin Britten: Illuminations
Diego Rivera, Mexican painter
 Peter Salem: Broken Wings
Anastasia Romanovna, Tsaritsa consort, first wife of Ivan the Terrible
 Ballet to music by Sergei Prokofiev: Ivan the Terrible 
Salvator Rosa, Italian Baroque painter, poet, and printmaker
 Cesare Pugni: Catarina or La Fille du Bandit 
Rudolf, Crown Prince of Austria, Crown Prince of Austria
 Ballet to music by Franz Liszt: Mayerling

S
Arthur Saint-Léon, French dancer and choreographer
 Ballet to music by John Field: Pas des Déesses  
Katharina Schratt,  Austrian actress
 Ballet to music by Franz Liszt: Mayerling
Clara Schumann,  German musician
 Ballet to music by Robert Schumann: Robert Schumann's Davidsbündlertänze
Robert Schumann, German composer
 Ballet to music by Robert Schumann: Robert Schumann's Davidsbündlertänze
George Robertson Sinclair, English cathedral organist
 Ballet to music by Edward Elgar: Enigma Variations
Princess Sophie of Bavaria, Archduchess of Austria
 Ballet to music by Franz Liszt: Mayerling
Spartacus, Thracian gladiator
 Aram Khachaturian: Spartacus
Princess Stéphanie of Belgium, Crown Princess of Austria, Hungary and Bohemia
 Ballet to music by Franz Liszt: Mayerling 
Henry Stuart, Lord Darnley, King consort of Scotland
 Ballet to music by Anton Webern: Episodes

T
Eduard Taaffe, 11th Viscount Taaffe, Austrian statesman
 Ballet to music by Franz Liszt: Mayerling 
Marie Taglioni,  Italian/Swedish ballet dancer
 Ballet to music by John Field: Pas des Déesses 
Tancred, Prince of Galilee, Norman Crusade leader
 Ballet to music by Raffaello de Banfield: Le combat

U

V
Baroness Mary Vetsera, Crown Prince Rudolf of Austria's mistress
 Ballet to music by Franz Liszt: Mayerling
François Villon,  French poet
 Robert Starer: Villon 
Alessandro Volta, Italian physicist
 Romualdo Marenco: Excelsior

W
Louise Weber (La Goulue), French can-can dancer
 Ballet to music by Emmanuel Chabrier: Bar aux Folies-Bergère

X

Y

Z

George Zorbas , Greek miner
 Ballet to music by Mikis Theodorakis: Zorba the Greek (ballet)

See also
 List of ballets by title

Ballet-related lists